

About Jago Grahak Jago (JGJ) 

Jago Grahak Jago is a consumer awareness program launched in 2005 by the Department of Consumer Affairs under the government of India. Under this scheme the various channels are created to spread awareness of rights among consumers and to stop wrong practices by merchants. The result of this was that many illegal things going on were stopped and good quality product is delivered to the end node. Under this scheme there was an establishment of consumer forum and court to handle cases filed by consumers. At consumer forum complaints are received and then proceedings over the case is carried out in court. By providing helpline number jago grahak jago achieved mass popularity and fast reached out to very end node i.e. consumer

Benefits of Jago Grahak Jago Programme 

 Halt to illegal practices: The best thing about jago grahak jago progra
mme was that on a single complaint action is taken to stop malpractices.
 Fixed rate on products: Consumer’s right of geting product at fixed rate in achieved i.e. no merchant can charge consumer more than the Maximum Retail Price.
 Right to bargain: Consumers right to bargain is fulfilled.

See also 
 Consumer Protection Act, 1986
 Consumer Protection Act, 2019

References

External link 
 

Indian advertising slogans
False advertising
False advertising law
Public awareness campaigns
Consumer protection in India
Hindi words and phrases
Government schemes in India